Kemal Güleş (born 1999) is a Turkish amputee footballer playing as forward. He is a member of the Turkey national amputee football team.

Kemal Güleş was born in Şırnak, Turkey in 1999. As a result of a rockslide accident occurred at a construction site in 2011, his left leg was amputated below the knee after treatment in hospitals in Şırnak, Diyarbakır and Ankara.

Sport career 
He was introduced into amputee football by ampute footballer  Osman Çakmak during his stay in the rehabilitation hospital in Ankara. He remembers that he fell around hundred times during the first training. He became an amputee footballer, and finally was admitted to the Turkey national team.

Honours 
International
 World Cup
 Winners (1):  2022
 Runners-up (1): 2018

 European Championship
 Winners (2): 2017, 20121

References 

1999 births
Living people
Sportspeople from Şırnak
Turkish amputee football players
Turkey international amputee football players
Association football forwards